Skytrax (originally known as Inflight Research Services) is a United Kingdom–based consultancy which runs an airline and airport review and ranking site.

Services
Skytrax conducts research for commercial airlines, as well as taking surveys from international travellers to rate cabin staff, airports, airlines, airline lounges, in-flight entertainment, on-board catering, and several other elements of air travel. Apart from these evaluations, Skytrax has an airline forum where passengers give potential passengers insights and opinions about an airline. The website also hosts flight reviews, flight checks, and satisfaction surveys. Skytrax holds an annual World Airline Awards and World Airport Awards, as well as the ranking for airlines and airports.

Controversies
Skytrax claims on its website that it has no economic ties to the airlines and airports that are presented with Skytrax awards, which it says are based on votes by passengers. In fact any person may vote, one vote per IP address. Skytrax provides remunerated consulting services to airlines and airports, and there are doubts as to whether this arrangement allows Skytrax to be objective in the awards that it issues, to wit:

In 2011, Skytrax's award of a 5-star rating to Hainan Airlines subsequent to a consulting project that it completed for the airline raised doubts about the objectivity of the award.

In 2012, the online investigations company KwikChex filed five complaints with the UK Advertising Standards Authority related to statements on the Skytrax web site describing the volume and reliability of their reviews as well as the official status and update frequency of their ratings. The ASA ruled that there was no evidence that Skytrax had followed the robust procedures it claimed it had in place to check all reviews were genuine. Although Skytrax argued that every review underwent a four-stage authentication process, it said it was unable to provide proof it had followed its own procedures as customer emails were deleted 24 hours after a review was submitted. The authority upheld all five complaints and Skytrax agreed to modify some promotional wording.

In 2014, Etihad stopped participating in Skytrax ratings.

In 2015, news company Skift concluded that Skytrax had "wildly inflated" the number of persons participating in its annual survey. Skift reported:
The principal partner appears to be Skytrax’s founder Edward Plaisted, whose background in aviation, or outside of aviation, is unknown. Skift has tried on more than one occasion to get insights from the Skytrax on its methodology, metrics, and business organization with no success. Questions answered by its press representative were later claimed to be off the record, and statements given for previous stories were asked to be retracted.

Skytrax's 2019 downgrading of Turkish Airlines to a three-star carrier, subsequent to its 2018 pulling out of Skytrax, elicited much criticism and accusations of dishonesty in the awards and doubts as to whether Skytrax actually uses the methodology that it states that it uses. Similar criticism arose when Skytrax awarded Lufthansa an award for a future cabin interior in 2019, subsequent to a consulting project that it had completed for the airline.

Awards
Skytrax presents awards annually to airports and airlines that it considers noteworthy in their performance.

Airline of the year

Airport of the year

Airline rankings

The World's 5-star Airlines
Skytrax currently certifies only its top 10–rated airlines with 5 stars.

Sources:

Former 5-star Airlines

Airline with the Best Airport Services

Best Inflight Entertainment

Best Aircraft Cabin Cleanliness

World's Best Regional Airlines (Short haul flight)

World's Best Airline Alliance

Airport rankings

The World's 5-Star Airports
Source:

World's Best Airports

World's Cleanest Airports

SkyTrax added anti-COVID-19 awards for airports in 2020.

World's Best Airport Terminals

World's Best Transit Airports

References

External links
 

Business services companies of the United Kingdom
Aviation in the United Kingdom